Campomanesia laurifolia is a species of plant in the myrtle family, Myrtaceae. It is endemic to Atlantic Forest habitats in Rio de Janeiro state of southeastern Brazil. It is a Critically endangered species on the IUCN Red List, and is threatened by habitat loss.

References

laurifolia
Endemic flora of Brazil
Flora of the Atlantic Forest
Flora of Rio de Janeiro (state)
Critically endangered flora of South America
Taxonomy articles created by Polbot